Bailetti is an Italian surname. Notable people with the surname include:

Antonio Bailetti (born 1937), Italian cyclist
Héctor Bailetti (born 1947), Peruvian footballer
Paolo Bailetti (born 1980), Italian cyclist

Italian-language surnames